The Naturmuseum Senckenberg is a museum of natural history, located in Frankfurt am Main. It is the second-largest of its type in Germany. In 2010, almost 517,000 people visited the museum owned by the Senckenberg Nature Research Society. Senckenberg's slogan is "World of biodiversity". , the museum exhibits 18 reconstructed dinosaurs.

History 
In 1763, Johann Christian Senckenberg donated 95,000 guilders–his entire fortune–to establish a community hospital and to promote scientific projects. Senckenberg died in 1772. In 1817, in Senckenberg's memory, 32 Frankfurt citizens founded the  non-profit Senckenberg Nature Research Society (in German: Senckenberg Gesellschaft für Naturforschung (SGN)), a member of the Leibniz Association. Soon after,  donated his collection of bird and mammal specimens to the society. The Naturmuseum Senckenberg was founded in 1821, just four years later. First located near the Eschenheimer Turm, the museum moved to a new building on Senckenberganlage in 1907. During World War II, the building was partly destroyed. However, the exhibits had been evacuated before.

Building 
The neo-baroque building housing the Senckenberg Museum was erected between 1904 and 1907 by  outside of the center of Frankfurt in the same area as the Johann Wolfgang Goethe University, which was founded in 1914. The museum is owned and operated by the Senckenberg Nature Research Society.

Expansion plans 

Collections
The Senckenberg Museum Frankfurt has a large collection of animal, plant and geology exhibits from every epoch of Earth's history.

Dinosaurs

Diplodocus
Main attraction is a Diplodocus from Bone Cabin Quarry, Wyoming, donated by the American Museum of Natural History on the occasion of the present museum building's inauguration on 13 October 1907, The  mounted skeleton with additions contains bones of three different sauropod genera (Diplodocus and closely related Apatosaurus and Barosaurus).

Psittacosaurus
, a key holding is a fossilized Psittacosaurus from Liaoning, China, with clear bristles around its tail and visible fossilized stomach contents. The specimen was first reported in 2002. The exact date and locality of the discovery within Liaoning is unknown. A controversial debate about the legal ownership arose. In 2021, researchers described its cloaca in more detail and found similarities with the body outlet of birds. In 2022, for the first time a belly button was found in a dinosaur fossil. A physical life size reconstruction of the animal was prepared by paleoartist Robert Nicholls.

Edmontosaurus and Triceratops
Another originals are an Edmontosaurus annectens mummy from Lance Formation, Wyoming. and two Triceratops skulls. The museum bought the three specimen from fossil collector Charles Hazelius Sternberg and his sons in the early 20th century. The museum also exhibits a cast of a complete Triceratops, the museum's mascot.

Casts
Big public attractions also include the casts of Tyrannosaurus rex, an Iguanodon, the crested Hadrosaur Parasaurolophus and an Oviraptor.

Further casts or single bones:

 Archaeopteryx lithographica
 Brachiosaurus brancai
 Compsognathus longipes
 Euoplocephalus tutus
 Plateosaurus engelhardti
 Protoceratops
 Sinosauropteryx prima
 Stegosaurus stenops
 Amargasaurus cazaui
 Argentinosaurus huinculensis
 Austroraptor cabazai
 Carnotaurus sastrei
 Eoraptor lunensis
 Giganotosaurus carolinii
 Kritosaurus australis
 Panphagia protos

Birds
The museum contains a large and diverse collection of birds with 90,000 bird skins, 5,050 egg sets, 17,000 skeletons, and 3,375 spirit specimens (a specimen preserved in fluid). This is 75% of the known bird species, only a minor part is exhibited. A living reconstruction of the extinkt dodo is shown in a permanent exhibition.

Messel research and Mammalogy
In 2015, researchers found an foal fetus in the body of the petrified primeval horse mare. Also primates, crocodiles, bats, snakes, turtles and other fossils were found at Messel pit.

The mammal collection focuses on bats, primates, rodents, and insectivores. Historical cabinets full of stuffed animals are arranged in the upper levels; among other things one can see one of twenty existing examples of the quagga, which has been extinct since 1883.

Human evolution
The exhibition also includes reconstructions of the heads of human ancestors.

Others
Since the remodeling finished in 2003, a new reptile exhibit addresses both the biodiversity of reptiles and amphibians and the topic of nature conservation.

Gallery

See also
 Museumsufer
 Edmontosaurus mummy SMF R 4036
 Messel pit
 Museum of Natural History, Görlitz

Notes

References

Further reading

External links 

 
 
 
 

Museums in Frankfurt
Leibniz Association
Natural history museums in Germany
Museums established in 1821